Bhunjia, is an Eastern Indo-Aryan language of eastern India spoken by the Bhunjia community living in the states of Odisha and Chhattisgarh.

References

Eastern Indo-Aryan languages